CCPL may refer to:

 Collier County Public Library, the public library system serving Collier County, Florida.
 Cuyahoga County Public Library, the public library system serving Cuyahoga County, Ohio.
 Cadet Corporal, within the AAFC